Szychowice  is a village in the administrative district of Gmina Mircze, within Hrubieszów County, Lublin Voivodeship, in eastern Poland, close to the border with Ukraine.

History

World War II
In March 1944, the Ukrainian population of Szychowice was attacked by Polish partisans in retaliation for Massacres of Poles in Volhynia. Eight villagers were murdered and 150 houses destroyed.

References

Szychowice
Massacres of Ukrainians during World War II
Polish war crimes